David Mitchell Magerman (born 1968) is an American computer scientist and philanthropist. He spent 22 years working for an investment management company and hedge fund, Renaissance Technologies.

Early life and education
Magerman was born to Melvin and Sheila Magerman. His father owned All-City Taxi in Miami, Florida, and his mother was a secretary for a group of accounting firms in Tamarac.

Magerman received his Ph.D. degree from Stanford University in computer science. He also received his B.S. from the University of Pennsylvania.

Career
Magerman spent two decades working for James Simons’s New York-based investment management company Renaissance Technologies, where he developed trading algorithms.  In 2017, Magerman publicly opposed the views of his boss, Robert Mercer, concerning politics and race issues in America. Mercer, the co-CEO of Renaissance Technology, suspended Magerman without pay and later made the suspension permanent. That same year Magerman filed a federal lawsuit against Mercer, seeking an excess of $150,000 in damages over alleged racist comments and unlawful termination.

Business ventures
In order to maintain the Jewish community in his neighborhood, Magerman has worked on several business ventures. His first of these was Citron and Rose, an upscale kosher certified meat restaurant, with Michael Solomonov as the head chef. After seeing little to no benefit of an upscale dining experience, Magerman re-branded the establishment as C&R Kitchen, and split with head chef Solomonov. During this time, he opened a casual dairy restaurant across the street. To better serve the community, C&R Kitchen was closed and replaced with a more fast casual place, The Dairy Express, known for its high capacity pizza oven. However, both of these restaurants have closed, and Citron & Rose became, C&R the Tavern. Zagafen, a restaurant that was attempted to mimic the non-kosher, ZaVino, was also opened.

Philanthropy
Through founding The Kohelet Foundation, Magerman has donated tens of millions of dollars to local causes. Some of these include Kohelet Yeshiva High School (renamed from Stern Hebrew High School in the gift's honor), Yeshiva University and the Yeshiva Lab School.

In 2020, Magerman became a financial and vocal supporter of First Generation Investors, a 501(c)3 nonprofit organization that teaches high school students in underserved communities the power of investing and provides the students with real money to invest.  He guest spoke to its students during a virtual webinar in July 2020.

Freedom from Facebook
Magerman provided the initial funds for the campaign group "Freedom from Facebook", donating $425,000 as of late 2018.

Personal life
Magerman married Debra Magerman (née Kampel), on 8 August 1999. They have four children.

References

1969 births
Living people
20th-century American Jews
Computer scientists
American philanthropists
People from Long Island
Stanford University alumni
University of Pennsylvania alumni
21st-century American Jews